Khvajeh Vali-ye Olya (also Romanized as Khvājeh Valī-ye ‘Olyā and Khvājeh Valī-ye Bālā) is a village in Behnamvasat-e Jonubi Rural District, Javadabad District, Varamin County, Tehran Province, Iran. At the 2006 census, its population was 18, in 6 families.

References 

Populated places in Varamin County